Norman Igor Grelet (born 14 July 1993) is a Martiniquais professional footballer who plays as a midfielder for the club Golden Star, and the Martinique national team.

International career
Grelet debuted with the Martinique national team in a 3–0 friendly win over French Guiana on 5 June 2018. He was called up to represent Martinique at the 2021 CONCACAF Gold Cup.

References

External links
 
 

1993 births
Living people
Sportspeople from Fort-de-France
Martiniquais footballers
Martinique international footballers
Association football midfielders
2021 CONCACAF Gold Cup players